"The War Song" is a song by British band Culture Club, featuring background vocals from Clare Torry. It was released as the lead single from the band's third album, Waking Up with the House on Fire (1984), in September 1984. The song became the group's seventh top-five hit on the UK Singles Chart. In the United States, the single peaked at number 17 on the US Billboard Hot 100. Elsewhere, it reached the top 10 in several countries, including Australia, Canada, and Ireland, peaking at number one in the latter country.

Lead singer Boy George later stated on BBC3 that "most people are very ignorant politically and we're all told how glamorous war is." The band mostly played the song live during the 1980s and 90s. The group played the song at a gig on New Year's Eve 2011. They also performed the song in 2014.

B-side
In many countries, the single was released with a B-side consisting of a native-language version of the song, including those in Spanish, French, German, and Japanese. It was available in two different extended versions, a first in Culture Club discography. Its 7-inch picture disc was shelved, and remaining copies are very rare.

Critical reception
Cash Box said that "this strong anti-war statement is delivered with simple but effective words and a varied melody."  Billboard called it "an effervescent protest song, hard to disagree with."

Music video
The music video was directed by Russell Mulcahy. Lead singer Boy George is shown with flame-red hair, a provocative new look at the time, as well as black, white, yellow and blue wigs. The ending of the video features hundreds of children dressed as skeletons, frolicking around Shad Thames, London. The video cost more than £100,000 to make. When Pete Burns of English band Dead or Alive saw the video, he sent Boy George a wreath.

Track listings
Depending on region, Spanish B-side "La cancion de guerra" is another alternate-language version, including French version "La chanson de guerra", German version "Der Kriegsgesang", and Japanese version "Sensō no uta" ("戦争のうた").

7-inch single
A. "The War Song" – 3:57
B. "La cancion de guerra" – 4:06

12-inch single
A1. "The War Song" (ultimate dance mix) – 6:51
B1. "The War Song" (Shriek mix) – 6:16
B2. "La cancion de guerra"

Chart

Weekly charts

Year-end charts

Certifications

See also
 List of anti-war songs

References

Culture Club songs
1984 singles
1984 songs
Anti-war songs
Epic Records singles
Music videos directed by Russell Mulcahy
Song recordings produced by Steve Levine
Songs written by Boy George
Songs written by Jon Moss
Songs written by Mikey Craig
Songs written by Roy Hay (musician)
Virgin Records singles